China banks may refer to:

Places:
 China Banks (skate spot)

Financial Institutions:
 Chinabank
 Bank of China
 People's Bank of China
 List of banks in China
 List of banks in Taiwan
 Central Bank of the Republic of China (Taiwan)